The Arquebuse class was a group of 20 destroyers built for the French Navy in the first decade of the 20th century. Two ships were sunk during the First World War and the others were scrapped after the war.

Losses
The Catapulte was sunk after a collision with the British steamship Warrimoo near Bizerte, Tunisia, on 18 May 1918.

The Mousquet was sunk off the entrance of Penang harbour in the Strait of Malacca on 28 October 1914 by the German cruiser , which she was attempting to engage.

Ships

Citations

Bibliography

External links

 
Destroyer classes
Destroyers of the French Navy
 
Ship classes of the French Navy